The Puerto Rico Trade and Export Company  (CCE) is the government-owned corporation of Puerto Rico that establishes the island's public policy for the development of its trade industry.

Directors
 2009–2013: José Pérez Riera
 2013–2017: Frankie Chévere
 2017–present: Karla Michelle Angleró-González

References

External links
 www.comercioyexportacion.com - official site 

Government-owned corporations of Puerto Rico